Winners Take All is a 1987 film directed by Fritz Kiersch and starring Don Michael Paul and Geoffrey Wigdor.

Reception
Eleanor Ringel of The Atlanta Journal-Constitution wrote "The real stars of Winners Take All are the scores of anonymous stuntmen and women who ride their bikes over, under, around and through any number of astounding obstacles. Unfortunately, the filmmakers don't have the same technical expertise."

Cast
 Don Michael Paul as Rick Melon
 Kathleen York as Judy McCormick
 Robert Krantz as Billy 'Bad Billy' Robinson
 Deborah Richter as Cindy Wickes
 Peter DeLuise as Wally Briskin
 Courtney Gains as 'Goose' Trammel
 Paul Hampton as Frank Bushing
 Kathleen Kinmont as Party Girl #5

References

External links

1987 films
American auto racing films
Motorcycle racing films
Films directed by Fritz Kiersch
1980s English-language films
1980s American films